Sir Robert Rankin, 1st Baronet (18 October 1877 – 11 October 1960) was a Liverpool shipbuilder, and British Conservative politician, who was elected a Member of Parliament for Liverpool Kirkdale in 1931 until 1945.

Career
Rankin worked for Pollok, Gilmour and Company, before it was subsequently renamed, and he became director and chairman of shipbuilders Rankin, Gilmour and Company, Liverpool. He was president of the Lonsdale Unionist Division (1937–1947), a vice-president of the Royal Commonwealth Society, and a vice-president of the Air League of the British Empire.

He was selected High Sheriff of Lancashire for 1948.

Personal
Born in Liverpool in 1877, Robert Rankin was the elder son of John Rankin (b. 14 Feb 1845 Greenbank, New Brunswick, nephew of Robert Rankin) and his wife Helen Margaret (daughter of James Jack, married John 1 September 1875, died 1937). He attended Clare College, Cambridge, and in 1914, joined the 18th Royal Fusiliers (Public School Brigade), and later became a captain in the Royal Army Service Corps.

He had two daughters by his first wife, Helen Mary (daughter of James Edmund Baker of Tehran, Iran), who died in 1932. In 1940 he married Rachel Dufrin (daughter of Charles Dufrin Drayson of Melton Court).

Fortune
His step-father, John Joseph Fahie, left him a fortune in 1934. In 1937, the Rankin Baronetcy was created, becoming the 1st Baronet of Broughton Towers at Broughton-in-Furness. In 1946, Rankin gifted the mansion and 1205 acres, to Lancashire.

Death and funeral
Those attending his funeral at Golders Green Crematorium on Friday 14 October 1960 included Lady Rankin, Air Vice-Marshal and Mrs John Grandy (son-in-law and daughter), Mrs C.H.M. Shaw (daughter), Mr James Rankin (brother), Lieutenant R. Rankin and Mr John Cherry (grandsons), Mr and the Hon. Mrs George Drayson and Mrs K. Bull (brothers-in-law and sisters-in-law), Mrs Jefferson Hogg (sister-in-law), Mr and Mrs William Rathbone (nephew and niece), Mr and Mrs W. Rathbone, (great-nephew and great-niece.

After his death, he paid £506,159 gross death duty, and bequeathed £250 each to the Liverpool School of Tropical Medicine, the Royal Commonwealth Society, the Liverpool Conservative Association, and the Rankin Boys Club. His brother, James Stuart Rankin (1880–1960), Conservative MP for East Toxteth, 1916–1924) died nine days later on 20 October 1960.

Arms

References

Bibliography

John Rankin, A history of our firm: being some account of the firm of Pollok, Gilmour and Co. and its offshoots and connections, 1804–1920, publ. 1921, page 325

External links 
 
Mrs. Robert Rankin and her daughters at Broughton Towers, painting by Sir Alfred James Munnings, P.R.A., R.W.S, sold a Christies.
"The man who gave away his historic stately home", Cumbria Life, Thursday, 13 October 2005
"England and Wales Census, 1881 for Robert Rankin" at familysearch.org
Gilmour and Rankin Collection at Harriet Irving Library, University of New Brunswick

1877 births
1960 deaths
Alumni of Clare College, Cambridge
Conservative Party (UK) MPs for English constituencies
UK MPs 1931–1935
UK MPs 1935–1945
Baronets in the Baronetage of the United Kingdom
Royal Army Service Corps officers
Members of the Parliament of the United Kingdom for Liverpool constituencies
High Sheriffs of Lancashire
People from Broughton-in-Furness